Tekniska högskolan is a station on the red line of the Stockholm metro, located in the districts Östermalm and Norra Djurgården, near the Royal Institute of Technology (Kungliga Tekniska högskolan). The station was opened on 30 September 1973  as the northern terminus of the extension from Östermalmstorg. On 12 January 1975, the line was extended further north to Universitetet. Tekniska högskolan metro station is connected to Stockholm East Station or Stockholms östra, a station on the Roslagsbanan railway, and a terminal for buses towards Norrtälje and Vaxholm.

Quotes from the history of science are interspersed with paintworks and sculptures such as Newton's apple, the wings of Icarus, and the five Platonic solids representing the classical elements – a dodecahedron, symbolising the aether and containing the "black hole of the universe", is suspended from the central ceiling. As one of the first "cave stations" where the walls follow the contours of the underlying bedrock, Tekniska högskolan (along with nearby Stadion) metro station was awarded the 1973 Kasper Salin Prize.

References

External links
Tekniska högskolan metro station images

Red line (Stockholm metro) stations
Railway stations opened in 1973
1973 establishments in Sweden